Francis Oliver Matthews (November 2, 1916 – August 24, 1999) was a baseball first baseman in the Negro leagues. Matthews, whose father was from Barbados, 
was born and raised in Cambridge, Massachusetts, where he attended the prestigious Rindge Technical School.  By the time he graduated in 1935, Matthews ability as one of the best baseball players in the Greater Boston area led to him being recognized as the first black captain of the Rindge Baseball team.

From 1935 to 1946, Matthews played with several Negro league teams, mostly the Boston Royal Giants and the Newark Eagles and one game with the Kansas City Monarchs at Fenway Park in 1943. The wear of travel and the low salaries of the Negro leagues got to Matthews forcing him to decide to return to Boston in 1942 to work at the Watertown Arsenal. He never left baseball though. Matthews starred as one of three black players on the Watertown Arsenal Boston Park League team for many years.

Military service
Matthews enlisted in the United States Army in 1950, and was stationed in Germany in 1952. He served in the Vietnam War, where was wounded by shrapnel in his leg and received a Purple Heart. He also received a Bronze Star Medal. He completed his service in 1972 as a first sergeant.

References

External links
 and Seamheads
SABR Biography
Negro League Baseball Players Association

1916 births
1999 deaths
Philadelphia Giants players
United States Army personnel of the Vietnam War
Newark Eagles players
Kansas City Monarchs players
Philadelphia Stars players
American people of Barbadian descent
Sportspeople of Barbadian descent
United States Army non-commissioned officers
20th-century African-American sportspeople
Baseball infielders